Timothy A. McGinnis (born July 4, 1971) is an American politician. He is a member of the South Carolina House of Representatives from the 56th District, serving since 2018. He is a member of the Republican party.

References

Living people
1971 births
Republican Party members of the South Carolina House of Representatives
21st-century American politicians
Georgia Southern University alumni
People from Washington, Pennsylvania